Anderstorp is a locality situated in Gislaved Municipality, Jönköping County, Sweden with 4,965 inhabitants in 2010.

Scandinavian Raceway, which hosted the Swedish Grand Prix Formula One races in 1973–1978, is situated here.

Anderstorp also hosts the Anderstorps SK, famous for its men's handball teams, and has most industries in Sweden (per person).

Notable residents
Jonatan Nielsen (born 1993), Swedish ice hockey player

References

External links

Populated places in Jönköping County
Populated places in Gislaved Municipality
Finnveden